Spencer Compton may refer to:
Spencer Compton, 2nd Earl of Northampton (1601–1643), British politician
Spencer Compton, 1st Earl of Wilmington (1673–1743), British statesman and Prime Minister
Spencer Compton, 8th Earl of Northampton (1738–1796), British politician
Spencer Compton, 2nd Marquess of Northampton (1790–1851), British nobleman
Spencer Compton, 7th Marquess of Northampton (born 1946), British nobleman